Ralph (or Ranulph) Dacre, 1st Baron Dacre (ca. 1290 – April 1339) was an English peer.

Dacre was the son of Sir William Dacre of Cumberland.

In 1321 he was summoned to the House of Lords as Lord Dacre. In 1331 he was appointed High Sheriff of Cumberland and Governor of Carlisle.

He married Margaret de Multon, Baroness Multon of Gilsland. Dacre carried off his bride-to-be, a ward of Edward III, from Warwick Castle where she was in the care of Thomas de Beauchamp; the official record states:Ranulph de Dacre pardoned for stealing away in the night, out of the King's custodie, from his Castell of Warwick, of Margaret, daughter and heir of Thomas Multon of Gillsland, who held of the King in capite and was within age, whereof the said Ranulph
standeth indighted in curia Regis.

He commanded the English in the Battle of Dornock. Lord Dacre died in April 1339 and was succeeded in the barony by his eldest son, William. His third and fourth sons Ralph and Hugh also succeeded in turn. Another son, Thomas, died without issue and did not succeed to the barony.

Notes

References
Kidd, Charles, Williamson, David (editors). Debrett's Peerage and Baronetage (1990 edition). New York: St Martin's Press, 1990, 

1290s births
Year of birth uncertain
1339 deaths
High Sheriffs of Cumberland
Ralph Dacre, 1st Baron Dacre
1